The Butterfly Tree is a 2017 Australian drama film directed by Priscilla Cameron. It had its premiere at the 2017 Melbourne International Film Festival, and was screened in the Discovery section at the 2017 Toronto International Film Festival.

Plot
Evelyn is an ex-burlesque queen who puts a curse on single dad Al and his son Fin with her zest for life. When both Al and Fin learn they are competing for Evelyn's love, their competition brings back memories over the death of Fin's mother.

Cast
 Melissa George as Evelyn
 Ewen Leslie as Al
 Ed Oxenbould as Fin
 Sophie Lowe as Shelley

Reception
The Butterfly Tree received mixed reviews from critics and audiences, earning a 46% approval rating on Rotten Tomatoes, based on 13 reviews with an average score of 5.71/10.

Accolades

References

External links
 

2017 films
2017 drama films
Australian drama films
2010s English-language films
2010s Australian films